Time Limit (1995-1998) was an American Thoroughbred racehorse sired by Gilded Time who broke down in the 1998 Jim Beam Stakes along with another colt by the name of Sorceror, who was out of Summer Squall. Event of the Year won the race. Time Limit and Sorceror were both Kentucky Derby prospects.

1995 racehorse births
1998 racehorse deaths
Horses who died from racing injuries